Endopeptidase or endoproteinase are proteolytic peptidases that break peptide bonds of nonterminal amino acids (i.e. within the molecule), in contrast to exopeptidases, which break peptide bonds from end-pieces of terminal amino acids.  For this reason, endopeptidases cannot break down peptides into monomers, while exopeptidases can break down proteins into monomers. A particular case of endopeptidase is the oligopeptidase, whose substrates are oligopeptides instead of proteins.

They are usually very specific for certain amino acids. Examples of endopeptidases include:

 Trypsin - cuts after Arg or Lys, unless followed by Pro.  Very strict. Works best at pH 8.
 Chymotrypsin - cuts after Phe, Trp, or Tyr, unless followed by Pro.  Cuts more slowly after  His, Met or Leu. Works best at pH 8.
 Elastase - cuts after Ala, Gly, Ser, or Val, unless followed by Pro.
 Thermolysin - cuts before Ile, Met, Phe, Trp, Tyr, or Val, unless preceded by Pro.  Sometimes cuts after Ala, Asp, His or Thr.  Heat stable.
 Pepsin - cuts before Leu, Phe, Trp or Tyr, unless preceded by Pro.  Also others, quite nonspecific; works best at pH 2.
 Glutamyl endopeptidase - cuts after Glu. Works best at pH 8.
 Neprilysin

References

See also 

 Exopeptidase
 The Proteolysis Map

EC 3.4